Maynard Lake is located on the English River system,  northeast of Kenora, Ontario.

Access
Maynard Lake is only accessible via seaplane. During the winter it can be accessed by logging roads and ice roads.

See also
List of lakes in Ontario

Lakes of Kenora District